Pilophorus fruticosus is a species of lichen in the family Cladoniaceae. Found in China, it was formally described as a new species in 2011 by Li-Song Wang and Xin-Yu Wang. The lichen has only been recorded from here and another locality in Yunnan, at a similar altitude. It contains the secondary chemicals atranorin and zeorin. The specific epithet fruticosus refers to the form of the lichen's pseudopodetia.

References

Cladoniaceae
Lichen species
Lichens described in 2011
Lichens of China